Holtby is a surname used by several notable people.

Braden Holtby, a Canadian ice hockey goaltender for the Dallas Stars.
John Holtby, a rugby union footballer for Leeds Tykes.
Lewis Holtby, a German footballer of English-German descent contracted to Blackburn Rovers.
Richard Holtby (1553 – 1640), an English Jesuit Superior and Roman Catholic priest.
Winifred Holtby (1898 - 1935), an English novelist and journalist.